PCO may refer to:

Organizations
 Parliamentary Counsel Office (disambiguation)
 Parti communiste ouvrier, the French name of the Workers' Communist Party of Canada
 Workers' Cause Party (Portuguese: Partido da Causa Operária), a political party in Brazil
 Pennsylvania College of Optometry
 Pickleball Canada Organization, Canada's national governing body of pickleball
 Polar Conservation Organisation
 Privy Council Office (Canada)
 Privy Council Office (United Kingdom)
 Public Carriage Office, the regulatory body for the taxi and private hire trade in London
 PCO Imaging, German developer and manufacturer of camera systems

Science
 Posterior capsular opacification, a complication of cataract surgery
 Principal components analysis
 Polycystic ovaries

Professions, qualifications and types of organization
 Pleasure Craft Operator Card or PCO Card, a proof of competency to steer a recreational or sporting boat (pleasure craft) in Canada 
 Precinct Committee Officer
 Private cable operator
 Professional conference organiser
 Prospective Commanding Officer, Naval term

Other
 Pendrell Corporation, the NASDAQ trading symbol for Pendrell Corporation (formerly ICO Global Communications)
 Penguin Cafe Orchestra, a musical group
 The Provisional Constitutional Order, an emergency order suspending the Constitution of Pakistan
 Public call office, the term that a phone booth provides a local call facility in India and Pakistan
 Punta Colorada Airstrip (ICAO code: PCO), a general aviation airstrip in Punta Colorada, Mexico
 Pierre Carl Ouellet, Canadian professional wrestler

See also

PCOS (disambiguation)